Eagle Theatre may refer to:

Eagle Theatre (Sacramento, California)
Eagle Theatre (Pontiac, Michigan), added to the National Register of Historical Places in 1984. 
Eagles Auditorium Building, a seven-story historic theatre and apartment building in Seattle, Washington 
 Eagle Theatre in Hammonton, New Jersey, the first theater in New Jersey to sell alcoholic beverages 
Eagle Theatre (Boston, Massachusetts)
Eagles Theatre in Wabash, Indiana

Lists of theatres